Sarcochilus spathulatus, commonly known as the small butterfly orchid, is a small epiphytic orchid endemic to eastern Australia. It has a single, more or less pendent growth with up to ten thin, leathery leaves and up to five green to dark brown flowers with a cream-coloured labellum that has purple markings.

Description
The sepals and petals are narrow oblong, often distinctly expanded near the tip. The side lobes are erect, expanded near the tip and the middle lobe is purple. Flowering occurs between July and October.

Taxonomy and naming
Sarcochilus spathulatus was first formally described in 1927 by Richard Sanders Rogers and the description was published in Transactions and Proceedings of the Royal Society of South Australia. The specific epithet (spathulatus) is derived from the Latin word spatha meaning "paddle for stirring or mixing".

Distribution and habitat
The small butterfly orchid grows on the outer branches of trees in rainforest or drier forests near streams. It is found between the Bunya Mountains in Queensland and the Hunter River in New South Wales.

References

Endemic orchids of Australia
Orchids of New South Wales
Orchids of Queensland
Plants described in 1927
spathulatus